Pramod Payyannur is an Indian director and writer who works in Malayalam theater. He has left his mark on the Malayalam arts and culture; Theater Arts is the main field but he has also created a place of his own in the visual media. Has also directed  a film Balayakala Sakhi based on  Vaikom Mohammad Basheer's novel Balyakalasakhi, which acted by Mammootty, Isha Talwar,Seema Biswas, Meena, KPAC Lalitha and Mamukkoya. Pramod was the writer of Vishwaguru, the film was recorded in Guinness World Records as the fastest film produced. The film was scripted, created, and released in 51 hours and two minutes. He is currently working as the Member Secretary of Bharat Bhavan Kerala, an official cultural exchange centre for Kerala Government, Thiruvananthapuram, Kerala.

Education 
Pramod Payyannur currently has a Bachelor's degree with the First Rank in Direction from the school of Drama and a Masters in Professional Arts from Pondicherry University. He is pursuing a PhD. from Visva Bharati University for Visual Images in Tagore Literature.

Career

Filmography 
Balyakalasakhi (2014)

Awards

References 

Malayalam film directors
Living people
1971 births